This is a list of public art in Angus, one of the 32 local government council areas of Scotland. This list applies only to works of public art on permanent display in an outdoor public space and does not, for example, include artworks in museums.

Arbroath

Auchterhouse

Brechin

Carmyllie

Carnoustie

Craigo

Farnell

Kirkton of Glenisla

Kirriemuir

Lunan

Menmuir

Monifieth

Montrose

Tarfside

Tealing

References

Angus
Outdoor sculptures in Scotland
Statues in Scotland